Anthaxioides aurorus is a species of beetles in the family Buprestidae, the only species in the genus Anthaxioides.

References

Monotypic Buprestidae genera